3,3,5-Trimethylcyclohexanol is a precursor to the vasodilator cyclandelate, the sunscreen component homosalate and the VP nerve agent. It can be synthesized by hydrogenation of isophorone. It has a mint flavour.

See also
Cyclandelate
VP (nerve agent)
Homosalate

References

Cyclohexanols
Nerve agent precursors